McCormick Tractors International Ltd. is the agricultural machinery company formed in 2000 when Case IH divested assets in order to gain European Union regulatory approval to merge with New Holland Ag. The  initial assets of McCormick bought by ARGO SpA were the Case IH tractor manufacturing plant in Doncaster, England, the rights to the Case IH model C, CX and MX-C and a licence to build MX Maxxum tractors. Most of the remainder of the Case IH and New Holland assets became CNH Global. The tractors are named for the McCormick family of Chicago and Virginia.

The Doncaster plant was the headquarters of the McCormick company.  The plant had a long history of producing tractors for Case IH and International Harvester and under its new ownership continued to produce tractors for Case IH under the terms of a European antitrust agreement.

McCormick Tractors International Ltd was a subsidiary of ARGO SpA until production was transferred to the ARGO Tractors factory in Italy and 'McCormick' became a brand only.

In December 2006, ARGO SpA announced that the Doncaster facility was to close with the loss of around 325 jobs. The statement immediately hit the local news, not only for the job losses, but also because the announcement came a week before Christmas.  All McCormick tractor production moved to Fabbrico, Italy.  The Fabbrico site had been the main Landini factory and together with other ARGO Group factories in the area has since manufactured a common line of products carrying the Landini and McCormick brands.

The last tractor rolled off the Doncaster assembly line in December 2007, an XTX series tractor.  The KamAZ company purchased and transferred the assembly line with a view to assembling a version of the XTX series tractor in Russia.

International sales, service support and marketing activities transferred to the Italian factory and an independent distributor took on these responsibilities for Great Britain, and also for all of Ireland in 2017. Also used for transporting Heavy goods such as stones,concrete,grass and straw.

See also
 List of tractor manufacturers

References

External links

 McCormick Tractors
 
 Argospa.com
ARGO SpA
Agricultural machinery manufacturers of Italy
Tractor manufacturers of Italy
Vehicle manufacturing companies established in 2000